Ko Chiu Road Estate was a public housing estate in Ko Chiu Road, the upper hill of Yau Tong, Kwun Tong District, Kowloon, Hong Kong.

In 1964, the British Hong Kong Government announced that the estate would be named Yau Tong Bay Government Low Cost Estate (later Ko Chiu Road Government Low Cost Estate). It consisted of 11 blocks, built between 1971 and 1973. In 1973, the estate was renamed as Ko Chiu Road Estate.

The estate started redevelopment in the 1990s. The redevelopment plan was divided into 5 phases to construct Ko Yee Estate (Phase 1), Ko Chun Court (Phase 2) and Ko Cheung Court (Phase 3).

See also
Public housing estates in Yau Tong
Yau Tong Estate

References

External links 

Yau Tong
Residential buildings completed in 1971
Residential buildings completed in 1972
Residential buildings completed in 1973
1990s disestablishments in Hong Kong
Former public housing estates in Hong Kong
1971 establishments in Hong Kong